is a Japanese science fiction comedy manga series written and illustrated by Yusei Matsui. The series follows the daily life of an extremely powerful octopus-like being working as a junior high homeroom teacher, and his students dedicated to the task of assassinating him to prevent Earth from being destroyed. The students are considered "misfits" in their school and are taught in a separate building; the class he teaches is called 3-E. It was serialized in Shueisha's Weekly Shōnen Jump magazine from July 2012 to March 2016, with its chapters collected in twenty-one tankōbon volumes.

In North America, the manga has been licensed for English language release by Viz Media. The anime series has been licensed by Funimation. The series was obtained by Madman Entertainment for digital distribution in Australia and New Zealand. An original video animation (OVA) adaptation by Brain's Base was screened at the Jump Super Anime Tour from October to November 2013. This was followed by an anime television adaptation by Lerche, which aired on Fuji TV and its affiliate stations from January 2015 to June 2016. A live action film adaptation was released in March 2015, and a sequel, titled Assassination Classroom: Graduation, was released in March 2016.

As of September 2016, the Assassination Classroom manga had over 25 million copies in circulation. Both the anime and manga have been received positively.

Plot

Earth is left in jeopardy after an enormously powerful tentacled creature suddenly appears and destroys 70% of the Moon, leaving it in the shape of a crescent. The creature claims that within a year, he will destroy the planet next. However, he offers mankind a chance to avert this fate.

In class 3-E, the End Class of Kunugigaoka Junior High School, the creature starts working as a homeroom teacher where he teaches his students regular subjects, as well as the ways of assassination. He is also the best teacher they could ask for, helping them to improve their grades, individual skills, and prospects for the future.

As time goes on, the situation gets even more complicated as other assassins come after Koro-sensei's life, some coveting the reward, others for personal reasons. The students eventually learn the secrets involving him, the Moon's destruction, and his ties with their previous homeroom teacher including the true reason why he must be killed before the end of the school year.

The series is narrated by Nagisa Shiota, one of the students in the class whose main strategy in killing Koro-sensei is making a list of all his weaknesses over time. At first, Nagisa appears to be one of the weaker members of Class 3-E, but he later emerges as one of the most skillful assassins in the class.

Publication

Assassination Classroom, written and illustrated by Yusei Matsui, was serialized in Shueisha's shōnen manga magazine Weekly Shōnen Jump from July 2, 2012, to March 16, 2016. Shueisha collected its 180 chapters in twenty-one tankōbon volumes, released from November 2, 2012, and July 4, 2016. A VOMIC (voiced comic) version, which added voice clips to the manga pages, was featured on the Sakiyomi Jan Bang! variety show between January and June 2013. In North America, the series was licensed for English release by Viz Media. The twenty-one volumes were released between December 2, 2014, and April 3, 2018.

A spin-off manga, titled Koro Sensei Quest, written and illustrated by Kizuku Watanabe and Jō Aoto, was serialized in Shueisha's Saikyō Jump magazine from October 2, 2015, to October 4, 2019.

Related media

Anime

An original video animation based on the series was produced by Brain's Base for the Jump Super Anime Tour and shown at 5 Japanese cities between October 6 and November 24, 2013. It was bundled with the 7th volume of the manga, which released on December 27, 2013. An anime television series based on the manga began airing on Fuji TV from January 9, 2015 and ran for 22 episodes. The anime television was directed by Seiji Kishi at Lerche, with Kazuki Morita as character designer and Makoto Uezu as the lead scriptwriter. An OVA episode was included on the first BD/DVD volume released on March 27, 2015, following a screening at Jump Special Anime Fest in November 2014. The anime had been licensed by Funimation, who simulcast the series as it aired and began a broadcast dub version from February 18, 2015. Following Sony's acquisition of Crunchyroll, the series was moved to Crunchyroll. The two openings were released as singles on February 18 and May 27 respectively. The ending theme is "Hello, shooting star" by Moumoon.

The second season of the anime began airing on January 7, 2016 and ran for 25 episodes. Anime Limited has licensed both seasons in the UK.

On June 30, 2016, two anime films were announced: Assassination Classroom the Movie: 365 Days and Koro Sensei Quest!. Both aired on November 19, 2016.

Adult Swim's Toonami programming block began broadcasting Funimation's English dub of the anime starting on August 30, 2020.

Singles

Film

A live-action film was released in Japan on March 21, 2015. It opened at number one on the Japanese box office with $3.42 million and as of April 5, 2015, has grossed over $20 million. A second film, titled Assassination Classroom: Graduation, was released on March 25, 2016.

Video games
A video game based on the series,  was developed by Bandai Namco Games and released on Nintendo 3DS in Japan on March 12, 2015. In January of the same year, Bandai Namco also announced a mobile game based on the Assassination Classroom series, titled  The mobile game released later the same year. A sequel to the 3DS game,  was released by Bandai Namco  for the Nintendo 3DS on March 24, 2016, exclusively in Japan.

Koro-sensei appears as a playable character in J-Stars Victory VS, originally released in Japan for PlayStation 3 and PlayStation Vita on March 19, 2014, with an international version, J-Stars Victory VS+, released for PS3, PS Vita, and PlayStation 4 in Summer 2015.

Reception

Manga

Sales
In May 2013, over one million copies of volume 1 were printed, and individual volumes frequently appeared on the lists of best-selling manga in Japan. Volumes 2, 3, 4, 1, 5, and 6 placed 26th, 32nd, 36th, 37th, 41st, and 50th respectively on the list of the best-selling manga volumes of 2013, making it the seventh best-selling manga series in Japan of 2013 with 4,595,820 copies sold. As of September 2016, the manga had over 25 million copies in circulation.

Accolades
Assassination Classroom ranked first in "Nationwide Bookstore Employees' Recommended Comics" by the Honya Club website in 2013. It was nominated for the 6th Manga Taishō. It placed second in male-oriented comics category on the list of "Book of the Year" by Media Factory and manga news magazine Da Vinci. Nippon Shuppan Hanbai elected it the best work of 2013 in their "Recommended Comic Books Across the Country Clerk's Choice". It ranked first on the 2014 Kono Manga ga Sugoi! Top 20 Manga for Male Readers survey by Takarajimasha. In February 2015, Asahi Shimbun announced that Assassination Classroom was one of nine nominees for the nineteenth annual Tezuka Osamu Cultural Prize. It was nominated for the Best U.S. Edition of International Material—Asia in the 2016 Eisner Award. On TV Asahi's Manga Sōsenkyo 2021 poll, in which 150.000 people voted for their top 100 manga series, Assassination Classroom ranked 51st.

Anime

In November 2019, Polygon named Assassination Classroom as one of the best anime of the 2010s.

Notes

References

External links
 
 

Assassination Classroom
Action anime and manga
Avex Group
Comedy anime and manga
Coming-of-age anime and manga
Crunchyroll anime
Fiction about assassinations
Fiction about robots
Films with screenplays by Makoto Uezu
Fuji TV original programming
Human experimentation in fiction
Lerche (studio)
Manga adapted into films
Muse Communication
School life in anime and manga
Science fiction anime and manga
Shueisha franchises
Shueisha manga
Shōnen manga
Teaching anime and manga
Toonami
Viz Media manga